Saltfjorden or Saltenfjorden is a fjord in the municipalities of Bodø and Gildeskål in Nordland county, Norway.

The narrow Saltstraumen strait connects the Saltfjorden to the large, inland Skjerstad Fjord.  The strait has a very strong tidal current, making travel difficult and dangerous.

See also
 List of Norwegian fjords

References

Fjords of Nordland
Bodø
Gildeskål